Carinascincus orocryptus, the heath cool-skink, mountain skink or Tasmanian mountain skink, is a skink endemic to Tasmania, Australia.  It is viviparous and mainly found in alpine areas, though occurring down to sea-level in the south-west of the state.

References

Reptiles of Tasmania
Reptiles described in 1988
Skinks of Australia
Carinascincus
Endemic fauna of Tasmania
Taxa named by Mark Norman Hutchinson
Taxa named by Terry D. Schwaner
Taxa named by Kathryn Medlock